Coal Creek is an unincorporated community in Wabash Township, Fountain County, Indiana, originally established as "Headley's Mills." According to Records of the U.S. Post Office Department, the name was changed by postmaster Samuel I. Snoddy to "Snoddy's Mills" on 24 October 1864, then changed again by postmaster John D. Orahood to "Coal Creek" on 11 July 1888.

The namesake body of water Coal Creek was so named from deposits of coal along its banks.

Geography

References

Unincorporated communities in Fountain County, Indiana
Unincorporated communities in Indiana